Iskra Leonidovna Babich (10 January 1932 – 5 August 2001) was a Soviet film director and screenwriter. Her 1981 film Muzhiki! was entered into the 32nd Berlin International Film Festival, where it won an Honourable Mention.

Filmography
 Pastukh (1957)
  First Date (1960)
  High Water  (1962)
 Muzhiki! (1981)
 Forgive Me, Alyosha (1983)

Awards
Muzhiki! 
 Vasilyev Brothers State Prize of the RSFSR (1981)
Prize at Film Festivals in West Berlin and Vancouver
 The Best Film in 1982 in a poll of the magazine  Soviet Screen

Personal life
She was married to actor Afanasi  Kochetkov (1930–2004). She died of cancer.

References

External links

1932 births
2001 deaths
People from Sochi
Soviet women film directors
Soviet screenwriters
Recipients of the Vasilyev Brothers State Prize of the RSFSR
Communist Party of the Soviet Union members
Gerasimov Institute of Cinematography alumni
Deaths from cancer in Russia